My Hero is a 1990 Hong Kong crime action comedy film directed by Bryan Leung, who also served as action director and acts in a supporting role in the film. The film stars Stephen Chow, Ann Bridgewater and Wilson Lam.

Plot
Restaurant waiter Sing (Stephen Chow) has always been obsessed with manhuas featuring triads and hoping to be part of them. One time, Sing rescues triad leader Wai Kit (Peter Yang), who takes Sing under his wing. Sing also becomes good friends with Wai's underlings Chun (Wilson Lam) and Bill (Shing Fui-On). Later, Wai intends to retire and chooses his successor from the aforementioned trio. Then, the trio are sent to the Golden Triangle for trading activities. Although faced with obstacles, they successfully completed the mission. However, after returning to Hong Kong, due to conflicts in the gang, Bill is killed, Sing becomes an outcast and Chun also dies while rescuing Sing. The melancholic Sing then leaves the underworld.

Cast
Stephen Chow as Sing
 as Ann
Wilson Lam as Chun
Peter Yang as Wai Kit
Shing Fui-On as Bill Chu
Bryan Leung as Hung Yee
Yuen Woo-ping as Yi
Lung Ming Yan as Vietnamese drug boss
Lily Li as Heung
Tung Chi as Ming
Cheung Miu Hau as Shark Tak
Cho Chung Sing as Thai General Bai Chai
Ho Tung
Chiang Tao as Bai Chai's man / Man in Nightclub
Pomson Shi as Wai's killer
Alex Ng as Wai's bodyguard
James Ha as Hung Yee's gunman at nightclub / Soldier
So Hon Sang as Hung Yee's gunman at nightclub
Lau Kwai Fong as Bill's wife
Yeung Yau Cheung as Nightclub manager
Cheung Ka Yan
Cheung Kwok Leung as One of Wai's Men
Ho Chi Moon as Uncle Chun
Mai Kei as Rascal harassing Ann
Lai Sing Kwong
Cheung Siu

Box office
The film grossed HK$15,149,253 at the Hong Kong box office during its theatrical run from 22 March to 11 April 1990 in Hong Kong.

External links

My Hero at Hong Kong Cinemagic

My Hero film review at LoveHKFilm.com

1990 films
1990s crime comedy films
1990 action comedy films
Hong Kong action comedy films
Hong Kong crime comedy films
Hong Kong slapstick comedy films
Triad films
Gun fu films
Hong Kong gangster films
1990s Cantonese-language films
Films set in Hong Kong
Films shot in Hong Kong
1990s Hong Kong films